Aga Bai Arechyaa 2  is a 2015 Indian Marathi language film directed and also co-written by Kedar Shinde. It is a sequel to the blockbuster Marathi movie Aga Bai Arrecha!. According to some film critics, Aga Bai Arechyaa 2 had one of the best background scores in the Marathi film industry. The music was also very well accepted by the audiences. Director Kedar Shinde is well known to have good music in all his films, he being the grandson of the late Shahir Sable (Maharashtrian folk legend and an accomplished singer, writer, playwright, performer, and Loknatya (folk theater) producer-director). The movie was produced by Narendra Firodia, Bela Shende and Sunil Lulla under the banner of Kedar Shinde Productions and Anushka Motion Pictures & Entertainment and was distributed by Eros International. The film features a cast of Sonali Kulkarni, Dharamendra Gohil, Surabhi Hande, Shivraj Waichal, Milind Fatak, Bharat Jadhav, and Prasad Oak, with Siddharth Jadhav making a special appearance. The movie was released worldwide on 22 May 2015.

Cast

 Sonali Kulkarni
 Bharat Jadhav
 Siddharth Jadhav
 Prasad Oak
 Dharamendra Gohil
 Surabhi Hande
 Shivraj Waichal
 Milind Fatak, 
 Uma Sardeshmukh
 Vidya Patwardhan
 Swapnil Munot
 Varun Upadhye 
 Gauravi Joshi 
 Maadhav Deochake
 Rajesh Bhosale 
 Rajesh Singh 
 Namya Saxena

Soundtrack 

The Background score has been composed by Sai & Piyush and the music has been composed by Nishaad, the lyrics are written by Ashwini Shende, Omkar Mangesh Datt and Manohar Golambre.

Critical reception

Mihir Bhanage of The Times of India gave the film a rating of 2.5 out of 5 and said that, "When you have people like Sonali, Bharat, Prasad and Milind Phatak in the cast, there are certain expectations that you go to watch the film with, considering all of them are good actors. But by the time you get to the second half of the film you are torn between high expectations and mediocre presentation. And by the end of the film, you are thoroughly disappointed." Keyur Seta of Marathi Stars gave the film a rating of 2 out of 5 saying that, "Aga Bai Arechyaa 2 fails due to basic issues. Also, the overall setting and characters appear outdated in today’s era."

References

External links 

 
 

2010s Marathi-language films
2015 films